The 1992 Likud leadership election was held on 20 February 1992 to elect the leader of the Likud party. It saw the reelection of Yitzhak Shamir, who defeated challenges from David Levy and Ariel Sharon

Background
The leadership election took place in advance of the 1992 Knesset election. Earlier on the same day as the Likud leadership election, the unofficial tally of the leadership election of the rival Israeli Labor Party showed Yitzhak Rabin as winning that party's leadership.

Both of Shamir's challengers had previously run against him for leadership (Levy in 1983 and Sharon in 1984).

Candidates
David Levy, minister of foreign affairs
Yitzhak Shamir, incumbent leader and incumbent prime minister
Ariel Sharon, minister of housing and construction

Election procedure
The electorate for the leadership election were the 3,000 members of Likud's Central Committee. A week before the vote, the party moved to change the required threshold to avoid a runoff election to 40% from the previous 50%.

Result

References

Likud leadership
Likud leadership elections
Herut
Likud leadership election
Ariel Sharon